Gothic Cruise is a small, annual electronic gothic music festival operating since 1989. It has been continuously from a variety of ports within the United States of America with live entertainment since 2007.

History

1989–2003 
In 1989 the first event sailed with 10 people and the company claims to have had and average 140 people per sailing by 2003.

They sailed on Premier Cruise Line, Regal Cruise Lines, and Royal Caribbean Cruise Lines.

There were no live bands during this time.

2004–2006 
2004–2005 there were no sailings.

2006 – Collide was scheduled to play as the first live band on the cruise, but that sailing was cancelled due to Hurricane Katrina.

2007 
Vessel: Carnival Glory on Carnival Cruise Lines.

Passengers: 211

Port: Port Canaveral, Florida.

Live Act:
 VNV Nation

2008 
Vessel: Carnival Glory on Carnival Cruise Lines.

Passengers: 174

Port: Port Canaveral, Florida.

Live Acts: 
 Combichrist
 Deepest Symphony (No Showed
 Asmodeus X
 Phase Theory
 Red Flag

2009 
Vessel: Carnival Legend on Carnival Cruise Lines.

Passengers: 149

Port: Tampa, Florida

Live Acts: 
 The Crüxshadows
 Cruciform Injection
 State of the Union
 Modulate
Deepest Symphony had been scheduled, but cancelled, and were replaced with Phase Theory and Asmodeus X

2010 
Vessel: Carnival Liberty on Carnival Cruise Lines.

Passengers: 237

Port: Miami, Florida

Live Acts:
 Covenant
 Funker Vogt
 The Crüxshadows
 Panzer AG
 DuPont
 Prognosis

2011 
Vessel: Norwegian Sun on Norwegian Cruise Line

Passengers: 112

Port: Port Canaveral, Florida.

Live Acts:
 God Module
 Imperative Reaction
 System Synn

2012 
Vessel: Explorer of the Seas on Royal Caribbean

Passengers: 291

Port: Newark, New Jersey

Live Acts:
 VNV Nation
 Icon of Coil
 Aesthetic Perfection
 SITD

2013 
Vessel: Freedom of the Seas on Royal Caribbean

Passengers: 142

Port: Port Canaveral, Florida.

Live Acts:
 Ayria
 Bella Morte
 00tz 00tz
 Sonik Foundry

2014 
Vessel: Carnival Breeze on Carnival Cruise Lines

Passengers: 265

Port: Miami, Florida

Live Acts:
 VNV Nation
 VNV Classic
 The Crüxshadows
 Ego Likeness
 Ayria
 Bella Morte
 Rain Within

2015 
Vessel: Carnival Dream on Carnival Cruise Lines

Passengers: 147

Port: New Orleans, Louisiana

Live Acts:
 Angels & Agony
 Ego Likeness
 Velvet Acid Christ
 Stoneburner

2016 
Vessel: Carnival Legend on Carnival Cruise Lines.

Passengers: 68

Port: Seattle, Washington

Live Acts:
 The Gothsicles
 Stoneburner
 Voltaire

2017 (planned) 
Vessel: Carnival Legend on Carnival Cruise Lines.

Passengers: N/A

Port: Long Beach, California

Live Acts:
 Covenant
 Haujobb
 Lights of Euphoria
 Hopeful Machines

2018 (planned) 
Vessel: Carnival Gloryon Carnival Cruise Lines.

Passengers: 184

Port: Miami, Florida

Live Acts:
 The Birthday Massacre
 Diary of Dreams
 iVardensphere
 The Rain Within
 Stoneburner

See also 
 List of electronic music festivals

References 

Music cruises
Goth festivals
Industrial music festivals
Music festivals established in 1989
1989 establishments in the United States